Nathan Lee Miller (March 6, 1866 – August 30, 1933) was the ninth lieutenant governor of Alabama. A Democrat, Miller served Governor Thomas Kilby of the same political party, from 1919 to 1923.

Miller was the Birmingham, Alabama, city court's clerk and register from 1888 to 1898. During his time in Birmingham, Miller studied law, passing the bar in 1897. After practicing law for over two decades, Miller was elected the ninth lieutenant governor of Alabama on November 5, 1918. Miller also served the state as secretary of the Jefferson County Executive Committee, secretary of the State Democratic Executive Committee, and secretary of the State Campaign Committee.

External links 
 Biography courtesy of the Alabama Department of Archives

Lieutenant Governors of Alabama
1866 births
1933 deaths
Politicians from Birmingham, Alabama
Alabama Democrats